Williamsonia is a genus of plant belonging to Bennettitales, an extinct order of seed plants. Within the form classification system used in paleobotany, Williamsonia is used to refer to female seed cones, which are associated with plants that also bore the male flower-like reproductive structure Weltrichia.

Description 
The monosporiangiate female Williamsonia seed cone (sometimes described as a "flower" though this does not imply homology with angiosperm flowers) consists of an ovulate receptacle enclosed by bracts (modified leaves), with the receptacle bearing sporophylls with terminal seeds/ovules, which are surrounded by interseminal scales. As many as 25–50 ovules could be present in each cone. A cone is generally present at the termination of a first-order axis. The cones have been suggested to be wind pollinated. In at least some species, the cones increased in size during maturation, which might reflect the transformation of the interseminal scales into a fleshy coating possibly used to attract seed dispersers.

Associated plant parts 
Williamsonia is typically associated with the male flower-like reproductive structure Weltrichia. It is unclear whether the parent plants were monoecious (having both structures on one plant) or dioecious (where each plant only has one gender of reproductive organ). In Kimuriella densifolia from the Late Jurassic of Japan and Williamsonia gigas from the Middle Jurassic of England, the Williamsonia cone is associates with leaves assignable to the genus Zamites, while Williamsonia carolinensis from the Late Triassic of North America is associated with leaves assigned to Eoginkgoites. Kimuriella is thought to have been a divaricately branching, low growing shrub with a maximum height of 2–3 metres, with a growth form similar to that of Wielandiella, while Williamsonia gigas may have been more cycad-like. The affinity of the cycad-like Williamsonia sewardiana from Early Cretaceous of India to the family Williamsoniaceae has been questioned, with some scholars suggesting that the species may represent an early species of Cycadeoidaceae instead.

Taxonomy

Williamsonia was originally described as Zamia gigas by William Crawford Williamson. William Carruthers proposed the name Williamsonia in 1870, with the type species being W. gigas from the Middle Jurassic of England. When originally specifying the genus, Carruthers specifically referred to the foliage, which modern authors usually assign to the foliage genus Zamites. However, later authors beginning with Tom Harris's 1969 publication The Yorkshire Jurassic Flora used Williamsonia to refer to the ovulate reproductive organs.

Distribution
Fossils of Williamsonia are known spanning from the Middle Triassic to Late Cretaceous, and have been found worldwide, including in Europe, Australia, North America, East Asia India and South America.

References

Bennettitales
Jurassic plants
Cretaceous plants
Prehistoric plant genera
Early Jurassic genus first appearances
Toarcian genera
Aalenian genera
Bajocian genera
Bathonian genera
Callovian genera
Oxfordian genera
Kimmeridgian genera
Tithonian genera
Berriasian genera
Valanginian genera
Hauterivian genera
Barremian genera
Aptian genera
Albian genera
Cenomanian genera
Late Cretaceous genus extinctions
Fossil taxa described in 1870
Prehistoric plants of North America